Saint-Girons-en-Béarn is a commune in the Pyrénées-Atlantiques department in south-western France.

The commune was formerly called Saint-Girons, and was officially renamed Saint-Girons-en-Béarn on 7 July 2006.

See also
Communes of the Pyrénées-Atlantiques department

References

Communes of Pyrénées-Atlantiques